Eubanks Point is a point with steep ice-covered slopes which is marked by a rock exposure on the northeast face, located  west-southwest of the summit of Mount Loweth in the Jones Mountains. It was mapped by the University of Minnesota – Jones Mountains Party, 1960–61, and was named by the Advisory Committee on Antarctic Names for Staff Sergeant Leroy E. Eubanks, a United States Marine Corps navigator with U.S. Navy Squadron VX-6, who participated in pioneering flights of LC-47 Dakota aircraft from Byrd Station to the Eights Coast area in November 1961.

References 

Headlands of Ellsworth Land